Bowling Park is a public urban park near Bolling Hall in Bradford, West Yorkshire, England about  south south east from the city centre.
The park is irregularly shaped with an area of 
and is bounded by Bowling Hall Road, Burras Road, Bowling Memorial Cemetery, Parkside Road, Avenue Road, Bowling Park Allotments and Bowling Park Drive (formerly New Hey Road).

The park is grade II listed with English Heritage on their Register of Parks and Gardens of Special Historic Interest in England and is owned by the City of Bradford.

History 

In the late 1870s Bradford Council purchased large areas of land for the park, including part of the former grounds of Bolling Hall, Bradford.
Earlier in the 19th century part of this land had been mined for coal and ironstone.
In 1878 competitive plans were invited for the design of the park and later that year the plans by Kershaw and Hepworth of Brighouse were accepted.

The park was created between the years 1878 and 1880 and subsequently opened in 1880 by Angus Holden.
The design of the created park however, differed significantly from the Kershaw and Hepworth plans.
The Kershaw and Hepworth plans show a croquet lawn, a cricket ground and a large reservoir bordering the park in the east but none of these were ever constructed.
In the 20th century various ponds in the park were filled in so that none remain today, and an area in the south-east of the park laid out for golf.
Bowling greens, tennis courts and a second promenade were added in the 1920s.
A free, weekly timed 5km parkrun is held at 9am every Saturday.

Landmarks 

The main carriage entrance is in the north-east on Bowling Hall Road at Lister Avenue.
There is a second similar entrance in the north-west on Bowling Park Drive—both entrances having two-storey lodges.
In the west, there is another entrance from West Bowling with a tree-lined embankment approach.

Running through the park is a serpentine carriageway within which are a series of interlinked curving paths that together with shrubs and trees enclose a series of irregularly shaped zones.

The site slopes down to the north west making it suitable for tobogganing in winter.
There is a fenced off children's play area,
a youth cafe,
a multiactivities area,
crown green bowling greens operated by the bowling club,
and a pitch and putt course created in 1924.
Elsewhere in the park are the base and roots of a fossilised tree.
Friends Of Bowling Park is a voluntary organization who organize community fundays in the summer, and help keep the park free of litter, and along with Bradford Bees YMCA have helped establish Bowling Park Community Orchard.

Access 

Entry is free and the park is open at all times.
In the event of bad weather visitors have the option of going to Bolling Hall and Museum to the northeast on the other side of Bowling Hall Road. First Bradford 634 from Bradford Interchange every half-hour, 620 also half-hourly in the evenings.

Gallery

References

External links 

 Friends of Bowling Park
 Bowling Park Community Orchard: Bowling Park Community Orchard
 Documents: Register of Parks and Gardens of Special Historic Interest, Historic: Original park designs of Kershaw and Hepworth.
 Historic images: Floral Cenotaph, Floral Grand Piano (1923).

English Heritage sites in West Yorkshire
Parks and commons in Bradford